The 2009 Fremantle state by-election was held in the Western Australian Legislative Assembly district of Fremantle on 16 May 2009. It was triggered by the resignation of sitting member Jim McGinty.

The Labor Party was defending a seat that they had held continuously since 1924. The by-election was held in conjunction with the state referendum on daylight saving hours.

The Greens candidate, Adele Carles, won the by-election, and in doing so became the first Greens candidate to be elected to an Australian state lower house of parliament in a single-member seat.

Background
First elected to parliament at the 1990 Fremantle state by-election, McGinty became a minister in the Labor government of Carmen Lawrence in 1991. He held several portfolios until Labor's defeat at the 1993 state election. In Opposition, McGinty succeeded Ian Taylor as Labor leader in 1994, only to be replaced by Geoff Gallop prior to the 1996 state election. After Labor returned to power at the 2001 state election, McGinty again became a minister. Most significantly he served for seven and half years as Attorney-General in the Labor governments of Geoff Gallop and Alan Carpenter.

Following Labor's defeat at the 2008 state election, speculation among media and political commentators was that McGinty, by then almost 60 years of age, would resign his seat before the end of the term. He confirmed that speculation on 3 April 2009.

Candidates

Nominations closed on 17 April 2009. Later that day, the Western Australian Electoral Commission revealed the names of the candidates who nominated. They are as follows, in ballot paper order:

 Independent - Nik Varga, a real estate agent.
 Citizens Electoral Council - Rob Totten.
 Independent - Jan Ter Horst.
 Independent - Carmelo Zagami. Zagami previously stood as the Liberal Party candidate for the federal division of Fremantle at the 2004 federal election.
 Independent - Steve Boni. Boni previously stood as the Labor candidate for the district of Roe at the 2001 state election.
 Family First - Andriette du Plessis. Du Plessis previously stood as the Family First candidate for the federal division of Fremantle at the 2007 federal election.
 Labor Party - Peter Tagliaferri, Mayor of Fremantle. Tagiliaferri previously stood for this seat as an independent candidate at the 1990 Fremantle state by-election.
 Christian Democratic Party - Julie Hollett.
 Independent - Rosemary Anne Lorrimar, a nurse who previously ran for the Christian Democratic Party in Willagee in 2001 state election. She also stood in several elections for the DLP in the 1970s.
 Greens WA - Adele Carles. Carles was also the Greens candidate for Fremantle at the 2008 state election and came close to defeating McGinty.
 Sam Wainwright, standing for the Socialist Alliance, which is not registered as an official party.

The Liberal Party did not field a candidate.

Results
The Greens' win in Fremantle was the first time a Greens candidate was elected to an Australian state lower house of parliament in a single-member seat. It was also the first time they had outpolled the Labor Party on the primary vote in any Labor-held seat. Carles became the first Green to sit in the Western Australian Legislative Assembly, and with five members in the Parliament as a whole, the Greens achieved official parliamentary party status in Western Australia, giving them access to additional allowances, monies and staff. Carles later quit the party to sit as an independent after the publication of an affair with Liberal treasurer Troy Buswell.

References

External links
 

2009 elections in Australia
Western Australian state by-elections
2000s in Western Australia
Fremantle